The Bulletin of the Section of Logic is a quarterly peer-reviewed academic journal covering logic, published by Lodz University Press in collaboration with the Section of Logic of the Polish Academy of Sciences. It was established in 1972 by Ryszard Wójcicki (Polish Academy of Sciences), as a newsletter-journal designed for the exchange of results among members of the section with their national and international partners, as well as their collaborators. The journal focusses on logical calculi, their methodology, applications, and algebraic interpretations. The editor-in-chief is Andrzej Indrzejczak (University of Łódź).

Abstracting and indexing
The journal is abstracted and indexed in Scopus, Philosopher's Index, and zbMath.

References

External links

Open access journals
Quarterly journals
University of Łódź
Publications established in 1972
English-language journals
Logic journals
Polish Academy of Sciences academic journals